Cuyunon refers to an ethnic group populating the Cuyo Islands, along with northern and central Palawan. The Cuyunons hail originally from Cuyo and the surrounding Cuyo Islands, a group of islands and islets in the northern Sulu Sea, to the north east of Palawan. They are considered an elite class among the hierarchy of native Palaweños. They are part of the wider Visayan ethnolinguistic group, who constitute the largest Filipino ethnolinguistic group.

History
The Cuyonon jurisdictions during Pre-Hispanic times include Cuyo under the powerful Datu Magbanua, Taytay under the gracious Cabaylo Royal Family who met the remnants of Magellan's fleet who fled Mactan after Ferdinand Magellan died in battle, Paragua (Palawan) under Datu Cabangon who ruled south of Taytay and Busuanga under the peaceful Datu Macanas.

During Spanish colonization of the Philippines, Cuyo was one of the territories of Palawan that had the strongest Spanish presence, even being the capital of the entire Palawan province as one point.

Cuyonon culture

Significant populations 
Although the Cuyonon language is so closely related to Kinaray-a in Panay, very few Cuyonons actually live or speak Cuyonon in Panay, they instead settled west to the island of Palawan where the ethnic group is so closely associated now, this being the Province of Palawan declared Cuyonon as its official language. The fact also remains that most of the other ethnic groups of Palawan can fluently speak this language because Cuyonon had been the lingua franca of the Province of Palawan for many centuries already.

Indigenous Cuyonon Religion

Immortals

Diwata ng Kagubatan: goddess of the forest honored on top of Mount Caimana in Cuyo island
Neguno: the god of the sea that cursed a selfish man by turning him into the first shark

See also 

 Tagalog people
 Kapampangan people
 Ilocano people
 Ivatan people
 Igorot people
 Pangasinan people
 Bicolano people
 Negrito
 Bisaya people
 Aklanon people
 Boholano people
 Capiznon people
 Cebuano people
 Eskaya people
 Hiligaynon people
 Karay-a people
 Masbateño people
 Romblomanon people
 Suludnon
 Waray people
 Lumad
 Moro people

References

Ethnic groups in Palawan